Depraved to Black is an EP released by German heavy metal band Avenger in 1985, before they changed their name to Rage.

Track listing

Credits 
Peter "Peavy" Wagner – vocals, bass guitar
Jochen Schroeder – guitars
Alf Meyerratken – guitars
Jörg Michael – drums

References 

Rage (German band) albums
1985 debut EPs
Speed metal EPs